Valdas Vasylius (born 3 September 1983) is a Lithuanian basketball player. He played collegiately at Old Dominion University. He also represented the Lithuanian national basketball team at the 2007 Summer Universiade.

Growing up in Lithuania, Vasylius learned to speak Lithuanian, Russian and German before learning English.

College career
Vasylius began as the sixth man on the ODU squad, but was the star player by his senior year, being named to the All-CAA First team. He also led his team to the NCAA Men's Division I Basketball Championship his sophomore and senior years.

Professional career
After graduating with a degree in international business, Vasylius returned to Europe to play with Polish team Anwil Włocławek, signing a one-year deal with the club. He left Polish team due to lack of playing time and joined Rethymno BC in Greece and later BC Nevėžis in Lithuania. In summer he signed with his hometown team BC Neptūnas. While a talented offensive player, his lack of athleticism hurt his chances of catching on with an NBA team. He also played for BC Siauliai during the 2011–2012 season.

Vasylius started the 2019–2020 season with BC Šilutė in the NKL where he averaged 17.8 points and 8.3 rebounds in 4 games. He played his last game with Šilutė on 12 October 2019 and three days later he signed with Grindavík of the Icelandic Úrvalsdeild karla. In his Grindavík debut, Vasylius posted a double-double with 11 points and 10 rebounds in Grindavík's narrow loss against Haukar. He helped Grindavík to the Icelandic Cup Finals in February 2020 where it lost to Stjarnan.

After two years with BC Šilutė, he returned to Grindavík in August 2022.

Euroleague career statistics

|-
| style="text-align:left;"| 2014–15
| style="text-align:left;"| Neptūnas
| 10 || 1 || 14.8 || .464 || .261 || .556 || 2.6 || .8 || .2 || .1 || 6.8 || 5.9
|- class="sortbottom"
| style="text-align:left;"| Career
| style="text-align:left;"|
| 10 || 1 || 14.8 || .464 || .261 || .556 || 2.6 || .8 || .2 || .1 || 6.8 || 5.9

References

External links
 Valdas Vasylius at espn.com
 Valdas Vasylius at euroleague.net
 Valdas Vasylius at odusports.cstv.com
 Valdas Vasylius at nklyga.lt

1983 births
Living people
BC Krasnye Krylia players
BC Lietkabelis players
BC Neptūnas players
Grindavík men's basketball players
KK Włocławek players
Lithuanian expatriate basketball people in the United States
Lithuanian men's basketball players
Old Dominion Monarchs men's basketball players
Rethymno B.C. players
Small forwards
Basketball players from Klaipėda
Úrvalsdeild karla (basketball) players